James Beecham Trotter (March 23, 1923 - June 1, 1989) was a politician in Ontario, Canada. He was a Liberal member of the Legislative Assembly of Ontario from 1959 to 1971 who represented the riding of Parkdale.

Background
Trotter was born in Brandon, Manitoba in 1923. He was educated at the University of Manitoba and obtained his law degree at the Osgoode Hall Law School. He was called to the bar in 1950. He served in the Royal Canadian Air Force during World War II and saw service in the European theatre. He was appointed to the County Court in 1975 where he served as an Ontario District Court Judge.

Trotter was married to Grace and they had three children.

Politics
Trotter ran as the Liberal candidate in the Toronto riding of Parkdale in the 1959 provincial election. He defeated Progressive Conservative incumbent W.J. Stewart by 2,919 votes. He was re-elected in 1963 and 1967. During the 28th Legislative Assembly of Ontario he served on an average of eight Standing Committees of the Legislative Assembly during each legislative term, with a particular interest in legal, labour, welfare and education issues. Trotter lost, in the 1971 general election, to the NDP candidate, Jan Dukszta.

References

External links 
 
 Tribute in Legislative Assembly, June 6, 1989

1923 births
1989 deaths
Ontario Liberal Party MPPs
Politicians from Brandon, Manitoba
Royal Canadian Air Force personnel of World War II